Of the 28 Pennsylvania incumbents, 24 were re-elected.

See also 
 List of United States representatives from Pennsylvania
 United States House of Representatives elections, 1972

1972
Pennsylvania
1972 Pennsylvania elections